Belo Polje is a town in Serbia. It is situated in the Surdulica municipality, in the Pčinja District. The population of the town is 545 people (2002 census).

References

External links
 Belo Polje, Surdulica official page

Populated places in Pčinja District